The 2006 Home Hardware Masters of Curling was held from November 29 to December 3, 2006 at the Waterloo Memorial Recreation Complex in Waterloo, Ontario. The event is not to be confused with the February event that happened in the same year but in the previous season.

Glenn Howard's rink won their first of four straight Masters tournaments, defeating Randy Ferbey's rink in the final with a score of 5–4.

Round robin standings

Playoffs
Tie breakers:
Simmons 6, Adams 3

References
The Globe and Mail, December 4, 2006, pg S4.

Masters Of Curling (November), 2006
Sport in Waterloo, Ontario
Curling in Ontario
Masters of Curling
Masters of Curling
Masters of Curling
Masters (curling)